Kathrin Stirnemann (born 22 October 1989) is a Swiss former professional racing cyclist, who won a silver medal in the mixed team relay event at the 2020 European Road Championships.

Major results
2020 
 2nd  Mixed team relay, UEC European Road Championships

References

External links

1989 births
Living people
Swiss female cyclists
Place of birth missing (living people)
21st-century Swiss women